St. Thomas' College is a government primary and secondary school for boys in Matara, Sri Lanka. The college was initially founded in 1844 as a private Anglican school by Rev. Fr. N. J. Ondatjee. a missionary of the Christian Missionary Society of England, in Wellamadama, Dondra. It presently has over 4,000 enrolled students studying primary to secondary education.

History 
St. Thomas' College was founded by the Christian Missionary Society of England in 1844. The main concern of the various missionary bodies in Sri Lanka during the early period of British rule in Ceylon was providing English education.  As a result of this, St. Thomas' School later became a secondary school in 1914, as St. Thomas' College commenced in a bungalow in the village of Wellamadama, the current location of the University of Ruhuna. 

The school was founded by one of the first Anglican missionaries, Rev. Fr. N. J. Ondatjee, in 1844 with a few students and three teachers.

Odantjee was later succeeded by others, including Kumaratunga Munidasa, who promoted Sinhala language and literature. In 1960 St. Thomas' College was vested in the Government after a long period of missionary control. K. B. Jayasuriya became the first principal under Government administration. J. E. M. Fernando, K. B. Jayasuriya and E. A. de L. W. Samarasinghe reactivated the college's old boys association, which was defunct after its inauguration by S. J. Gunasekeram in 1934. B. D. Jayasekera designed the college flag and the crest in the early 20th century.

The Buddhist shrine room constructed at the College premises by the Old Boys Association in 1999 was inaugurated by Madihe Pannaseeha Thero, a Buddhist priest and also a past student of the college.

The school is one of the oldest cricket-playing schools in the island and plays St. Thomas'–St. Servatius Cricket Encounter with St. Servatius' College. This is the second oldest cricket encounter in the island, also known as the Southern Battle of the Blues or Battle of the Ruhunu. 

St. Thomas' College also introduced scouting and catting to Matara.

Past principals

 N. J. Ondatjee (1844–1848)
 Abraham Dias Abeysinghe (1848–1852).
 John Stevensen Lyle (1852 –1854).
 F. H. De Winton (1854–1856).
 Fedrick Dias Edirisinghe (1856–1858)
 Quancy Adams (1858 – 1860 ) 
 Clement La–brooy (1860–1865)
 A. W. Wijesinghe (1865–1866)
 W.E.Ferdinando (1866–1872)
 R.O. Macalam (1872–1878) 
 F.K. Dency (1878–1884) 
 J. W. Bultjens (1884–1890)
 R. C. Reginold (1890–1896)
 L. A. Arndt (1896–1902)
 S. J. Gunasekeram (1902 – 1903 ) 
 C.P. Fernando (1903–1910)
 J. C. Handy (1910–1915)
 M. S. Solomon (1915–1925)
 P.S.Adams  (1925–1934)
 C. C. P. Arulpragasam (1934–1944)
 R. V. L. Pereira (1944–1952)
 J. E. M. Fernando (1952–1959) 

Government Principals 
 K. B. Jayasuriya (1960–1975)
 E. A. De L. W. Samarasinghe (1975–1985)
 B. G. Sisira (1985–1999)
 Ratnasiri Suraweera (1999–2011)
 W. B. Piyathissa (2011–2022)
 P. A. Weerakkodi (2022 – present)

College Anthem 

The school song was composed by Leonard Archibald Arndt (1889–1955), the school's principal between 1931 and 1933.

College houses 

There are five student houses in the college, named after five past principals. They are:

  
 Bultjens : Red 
 Dias    : Blue 
 Ondatjee : Yellow 
 Edirisinhe : Green 
 Lyle :  Purple

Sports

Cricket 

The St. Thomas-St. Servatius Cricket Encounter, also known as Battle of the Blues or Battle of the Ruhunu, is the annual school cricket match played between St. Thomas' College, Matara and St. Servatius' College since 1900. This is the second oldest cricket encounter on the island.  The match has been played as a 3-day game since 2000, which was the centenary match.

Football 
The annual Thomas-Rahula Football Encounter' or "Battle of Golden Ensigns" football Match is played between St. Thomas' College, Matara and Rahula College. It is one of the first annual inter-school football matches in Sri Lanka.

Notable alumni 

List of alumni of St. Thomas' College, Matara;

See also 
 List of the oldest schools in Sri Lanka
 Lists of schools in Sri Lanka

References

External links 
 

National schools in Sri Lanka
Boys' schools in Sri Lanka
Former Church of Ceylon schools in the Diocese of Colombo
Schools in Matara, Sri Lanka
Educational institutions established in 1844
1844 establishments in Ceylon